The 1980 Jack Kramer Open, also known as the Pacific Southwest Open, was a men's tennis tournament played on outdoor hard courts at the Los Caballeros Tennis Club in Fountain Valley, California in the United States. The event was part of the Grand Prix tennis circuit. It was the 54th edition of the Pacific Southwest tournament and was held from April 14 through April 20, 1980. First-seeded Gene Mayer won the singles title and the corresponding $27,500 first-prize money.

Finals

Singles
 Gene Mayer defeated  Brian Teacher 6–3, 6–2
 It was Mayer's 3rd singles title of the year and the 5th of his career.

Doubles
 Brian Teacher /  Butch Walts defeated  Anand Amritraj /  John Austin 6–2, 6–4

References

External links
 ITF tournament edition details

Jack Kramer Open
Jack Kramer Open
Jack Kramer Open
Jack Kramer Open
Jack Kramer Open
Jack Kramer Open
Jack Kramer Open